Robert "Rob" Taylor (born March 6, 1971) is an American politician of the Republican Party serving a member of the Iowa House of Representatives for the state's 44th district from 2013 until 2019.

Taylor served as the Republican Party chairman for Dallas County, Iowa. In the 2012 elections, he ran for the Iowa House in the 44th district, which did not have an incumbent due to redistricting. Taylor won election to the Iowa House.  Taylor is the Iowa Representative Chair for the American Legislative Exchange Council.

Personal information 
Taylor was born and raised in Des Moines, Iowa, where he graduated from Abraham Lincoln High School in 1989. He then attended Des Moines Area Community College, and graduated with an Associate in Arts. He next enrolled at Upper Iowa University, where he graduated with a Bachelor of Science degree, and finally at William Penn University, earning a master's degree in Business Leadership.

Taylor and his wife, Christi, have four children, and live in West Des Moines, Iowa. Taylor works for a petroleum distributor as a sales director.

References

External links 
 Rob Taylor at Iowa Legislature
 
 Biography at Ballotpedia

1971 births
Living people
People from West Des Moines, Iowa
Upper Iowa University alumni
William Penn University alumni
Republican Party members of the Iowa House of Representatives
21st-century American politicians